My Name is the fourth Korean-language studio album by South Korean singer BoA, released on June 11, 2004 by SM Entertainment. It includes the title track "My Name" and the song "Spark", which is a Korean-language cover of Luis Fonsi's "Keep My Cool" (2002). 

Her first foray into the Chinese market, the overseas version of the album (sold in China, Taiwan, Hong Kong and other parts of Asia) was released on August 12, 2004, and includes remakes of two of her songs in Chinese and an alternative cover.

Commercial performance 
Commercially, My Name achieved success in South Korea, peaking at number one on the MIAK monthly albums chart for June 2004, and sold over 201,000 copies by mid-2005. It placed number seven for highest sales of the year. The album was further released in Japan on March 26, 2008; however, it failed to chart on the Oricon Top 100.

Accolades

Track listing

Charts and sales

Monthly charts

Yearly charts

Sales

Release history

References

2004 albums
BoA albums
SM Entertainment albums
Korean-language albums